Alan Chambers may refer to:

 Alan Chambers (explorer) (born 1968), British polar adventurer
 Alan Chambers (activist) (born 1972), former President of Exodus International
 Alan Chambers (Canadian politician) (1904–1981), Canadian politician
 Alan Chambers (Northern Ireland politician) (born 1947), Member of the Northern Ireland Assembly